Mofatteh Metro Station is a station in Tehran Metro Line 1. It is located in the junction of Dr. Mofatteh Street and Ostad Motehari Street. It is between Haft-e-Tir Metro Station and Shahid Beheshti Metro Station.

Tehran Metro stations